Tang Ching or Tang Jing (1 January 1924 - 2019) was a Chinese film actor and businessman from Zhengzhou, Henan, working in the Cinema of Taiwan and the Cinema of Hong Kong. He starred in at least 70 films between 1956 and 1984, most of them kung-fu pictures of the 1970s. He initially moved to Taiwan in 1949, where he joined the army troupe in 1949. He began his acting career there at the Agricultural Education Films Company and was then contracted by the Motion Picture & General Investment Co. Ltd by Yuen Chau Fung in 1963. He joined the Shaw Brothers studio in Hong Kong in 1967.

References

External links 
 

Male actors from Henan
Hong Kong male film actors
1924 births
2019 deaths
Businesspeople from Henan
People from Zhengzhou
Chinese male film actors
Chinese expatriates in Taiwan
Chinese emigrants to British Hong Kong